Ceylanlı is a village in the central district of Hakkâri Province in Turkey. The village had a population of 226 in 2022.

The hamlets of Doğanlı, Geçimli, Gelinli, Seyitli, Sütçüler and Yığınlı are attached to Ceylanlı.

History 
The village was historically populated by Assyrians and located in the Hakkari region.

Population 
Population history from 2000 to 2022:

References 

Kurdish settlements in Hakkâri Province
Villages in Hakkâri District
Historic Assyrian communities in Turkey